Baw Rei Soe Wai (born 11 May 1963) is a Burmese politician currently serving as a House of Nationalities MP for Kayah State No. 3 constituency.

Early life and education
He was born on 11 May 1963 in Demoso Township, Kayah State, Burma (Myanmar).

Political career
He is a member of the National League for Democracy. In the Myanmar general election, 2015, he was elected as an Amyotha Hluttaw MP, winning a majority of 8162 votes and elected representative from Kayah State No. 3 parliamentary constituency. He also serves as a member of Amyotha Hluttaw Public Complaints Committee.

References

National League for Democracy politicians
1963 births
Living people
People from Kayah State